The Famine Memorial, officially titled Famine, is a memorial in Dublin, Ireland. The memorial, which stands on Customs House Quay, is in remembrance of the Great Famine (1845-1849), which saw the population of the country halved through death and emigration.

History 
The memorial was created by Rowan Gillespie and presented to the city of Dublin in 1997. The sculpture features six lifesize figures dressed in rags, clutching onto their belongings and children. In 2007, similar figures were unveiled in Toronto, Canada's Ireland Park. The two memorials show emigrants leaving famished Ireland for a new life.

References

Further reading

1997 sculptures
Great Famine (Ireland) monuments and memorials
Monuments and memorials in the Republic of Ireland
Buildings and structures in Dublin (city)
Tourist attractions in Dublin (city)